This is a list of counties of Scotland created by the Local Government (Scotland) Act 1889 and abolished in 1975 by the Local Government (Scotland) Act 1973. The list includes the county town, area, and population density.

Counties

Cities
Historically cities were parts of larger counties. Edinburgh was in Midlothian, Aberdeen in Aberdeenshire, and Glasgow in Lanarkshire (although parts of greater Glasgow extended into other counties, e.g. Dunbartonshire and Renfrewshire).

See also
 Counties of Scotland
 List of counties of Scotland by area in 1951
 List of counties of Scotland by population in 1951
 List of counties of Scotland by population in 1971
 List of Scottish counties by highest point
 List of Scottish council areas by area
 List of Scottish council areas by highest point

Notes

References
 "Scotland Table 1" A Vision of Britain. Retrieved 27 December 2007.
 Keay, J. & Keay, J. (1994) Collins Encyclopaedia of Scotland. London. HarperCollins.
 "Scotland Table 1" A Vision of Britain. Retrieved 27 December 2007.